Sam Adkins (born April 26, 1965) is a retired American mixed martial artist. He is best known for his time in the UFC competing in the Heavyweight division fighting established fighters such as Ken Shamrock and Tank Abbott.

Mixed martial arts record

|-
| Loss
| align=center| 7-20-2
| George Paz
| TKO
| REF: Renegades Extreme Fighting
| 
| align=center| 2
| align=center| 0:58
| Houston, Texas, United States
| 
|-
| Loss
| align=center| 7-19-2
| Jesse Vasquez
| Decision (unanimous)
| REF: Renegades Extreme Fighting
| 
| align=center| 3
| align=center| 5:00
| Houston, Texas, United States
| 
|-
| Loss
| align=center| 7-18-2
| Eric Loveless
| Decision (unanimous)
| REF: Renegades Extreme Fighting
| 
| align=center| 3
| align=center| 5:00
| Houston, Texas, United States
| 
|-
| Win
| align=center| 7-17-2
| Jesse Vasquez
| Submission
| REF: Renegades Extreme Fighting
| 
| align=center| 2
| align=center| 0:33
| Houston, Texas, United States
| 
|-
| Loss
| align=center| 6-17-2
| Kristian Rothaermel
| TKO (punches)
| FFC 7: Freestyle Fighting Championships 7
| 
| align=center| 1
| align=center| 2:51
| Biloxi, Mississippi, United States
| 
|-
| Draw
| align=center| 6-16-2
| Luis Garcia
| Draw
| REF: Renegades Extreme Fighting
| 
| align=center| 3
| align=center| 5:00
| Houston, Texas, United States
| 
|-
| Win
| align=center| 6-16-1
| Elias Siam
| Decision (unanimous)
| REF: Renegades Extreme Fighting
| 
| align=center| 3
| align=center| 5:00
| Houston, Texas, United States
| 
|-
| Loss
| align=center| 5-16-1
| Edwin Dewees
| Decision (unanimous)
| RITC 39: Bring It
| 
| align=center| 3
| align=center| 3:00
| Phoenix, Arizona, United States
| 
|-
| Loss
| align=center| 5-15-1
| Robert Villegas
| Submission (heel hook)
| REF: Renegades Extreme Fighting
| 
| align=center| 3
| align=center| 1:30
| Houston, Texas, United States
| 
|-
| Loss
| align=center| 5-14-1
| Homer Moore
| Decision
| CLM 3: Combate Libre Mexico 3
| 
| align=center| 4
| align=center| 5:00
| Mexico
| 
|-
| Loss
| align=center| 5-13-1
| Tyrone Roberts
| Decision
| Dangerzone 13: Caged Heat
| 
| align=center| 2
| align=center| 6:00
| Texas, United States
| 
|-
| Draw
| align=center| 5-12-1
| Luis Garcia
| Draw
| REF: Renegades Extreme Fighting
| 
| align=center| 0
| align=center| 0:00
| 
| 
|-
| Loss
| align=center| 5-12
| Ken Shamrock
| Submission (kimura)
| WMMAA 1: MegaFights
| 
| align=center| 1
| align=center| 1:26
| Atlantic City, New Jersey, United States
| 
|-
| Loss
| align=center| 5-11
| Guy Mezger
| Submission
| FFC: Freestyle Fighting Championship
| 
| align=center| 1
| align=center| 2:11
| Dallas, Texas, United States
| 
|-
| Loss
| align=center| 5-10
| Bobby Hoffman
| TKO (doctor stoppage)
| EC 35: Extreme Challenge 35
| 
| align=center| 1
| align=center| 2:25
| Davenport, Iowa, United States
| 
|-
| Loss
| align=center| 5-9
| Ricco Rodriguez
| Submission (forearm choke)
| Armageddon: Armageddon 2
| 
| align=center| 1
| align=center| 4:32
| Houston, Texas, United States
| 
|-
| Win
| align=center| 5-8
| Mark Walker
| Submission (armbar)
| BRI 5: Bas Rutten Invitational 5
| 
| align=center| 1
| align=center| 6:07
| Colorado, United States
| 
|-
| Loss
| align=center| 4-8
| Gan McGee
| TKO (punches)
| BRI 4: Bas Rutten Invitational 4
| 
| align=center| 1
| align=center| 4:58
| 
| 
|-
| Win
| align=center| 4-7
| Brett Hogg
| Submission (keylock)
| Kickfest: Kickfest 1
| 
| align=center| 1
| align=center| 1:44
| Cedar Falls, Iowa, United States
| 
|-
| Loss
| align=center| 4-7
| Dan Severn
| Submission (fatigue)
| IFC 8: Showdown at Shooting Star
| 
| align=center| 1
| align=center| 12:53
| Mahnomen, Minnesota, United States
| 
|-
| Loss
| align=center| 3-6
| Kevin Jackson
| Submission (armbar)
| EC 18: Extreme Challenge 18
| 
| align=center| 1
| align=center| 4:21
| Davenport, Iowa, United States
| 
|-
| Loss
| align=center| 3-5
| Travis Fulton
| Submission (armbar)
| RnB 2: Bare Knuckle Brawl
| 
| align=center| 1
| align=center| 0:45
| Atlanta, Georgia, United States
| 
|-
| Win
| align=center| 3-4
| Clayton Miller
| Submission (guillotine choke)
| RnB 2: Bare Knuckle Brawl
| 
| align=center| 1
| align=center| 0:26
| Atlanta, Georgia, United States
| 
|-
| Loss
| align=center| 2-4
| Andre Roberts
| Submission
| EC 11: Extreme Challenge 11
| 
| align=center| 1
| align=center| 4:02
| Marshalltown, Iowa, United States
| 
|-
| Loss
| align=center| 2-3
| Brad Kohler
| TKO (cut)
| EC 9: Extreme Challenge 9
| 
| align=center| 1
| align=center| 6:56
| Davenport, Iowa, United States
| 
|-
| Loss
| align=center| 2-2
| David Abbott
| Submission (neck crank)
| UFC 11: The Proving Ground
| 
| align=center| 1
| align=center| 2:06
| Augusta, Georgia, United States
| 
|-
| Win
| align=center| 2-1
| Felix Mitchell
| Decision (unanimous)
| UFC 10: The Tournament
| 
| align=center| 1
| align=center| 10:00
| Birmingham, Alabama, United States
| 
|-
| Loss
| align=center| 1-1
| Don Frye
| TKO (doctor stoppage)
| UFC 8: David vs. Goliath
| 
| align=center| 1
| align=center| 0:48
| Bayamón, Puerto Rico
| 
|-
| Win
| align=center| 1-0
| Keith Mielke
| TKO (submission to punches)
| UFC 8: David vs. Goliath
| 
| align=center| 1
| align=center| 0:50
| Bayamón, Puerto Rico
|

See also
List of male mixed martial artists

References

External links
 

1965 births
American male mixed martial artists
Heavyweight mixed martial artists
Living people
Place of birth missing (living people)
Ultimate Fighting Championship male fighters